Heflin may refer to:

Places in the United States
Heflin, Alabama
Heflin, Kentucky
Heflin, Louisiana
Heflin, Virginia

Other uses
Heflin (surname)